The Semashko model is a single-payer healthcare system where healthcare is free for everyone. Unlike the Beveridge model, where national healthcare is funded through special taxation of the population, the healthcare in the Semashko model is funded from the national budget. The model is named after Nikolai Semashko, a Soviet People's Commissar for Healthcare. The model is largely continued in Russia and other post-Soviet states and is regarded as one of the most influential ones.

Features
In the Semashko model, medical services are provided by a hierarchy of state institutions under the supervision of Ministry of Healthcare and are financed from the national budget. For the country's citizens, medical services are free and equal, with an emphasis on social hygiene and prevention of infectious diseases. The model features publicly owned medical facilities, salaried health workers, large providers of primary healthcare and an exceptionally high degree of governmental administration, providing a universal healthcare. The Semashko model does not allow private medical practices, as all physicians in it are state employees. In the Soviet Union under this model all of the country's territory was divided into districts, with outpatient hospitals and local physicians assigned to each of them. These physicians were multi-special, able to treat most common diseases, while more complicated cases were referred to regional hospitals. 

A special feature of the Semashko model is the "method of dynamic dispensary surveillance", which holds that every detected case of a serious disease should be subjected to a certain set of guidelines, including planning curative activities, documenting them, ensuring the required number of contacts with specialists, a monitoring process and outcome indicators. Such guidelines were developed at a later stage, in the late 1960s.

History
The Semashko model originated in the aftermath of the 1917 October Revolution, as Tsarist Russia lacked a unified healthcare system. The model substantially improved the population health relative to the starting point of its implementation in the late 1920s. However, the model was less effective against non-communicable diseases and as such failed to advance the population health further. In the 1970s, with the availability of new medical technologies and popular demand for better care, the Soviet Union put greater emphasis on specialization in outpatient care, moving away from the Semashko model. With that, the significance of the district physician has considerably reduced.

References

See also
Bismarck model

Health in the Soviet Union 
Publicly funded health care 
Universal health care